Dynamism may refer to:
Dynamism (metaphysics), a cosmological explanation of the material world
Dynamism (computing), a computer term for management of simultaneous operations
Dynamicism, the application of dynamical systems theory to cognitive science
"Plastic dynamism", a term used by the Italian futurist art movement to describe an object's intrinsic and extrinsic motion

See also
Dunamis (disambiguation)